Frederick Cocks may refer to:

Frederick Seymour Cocks, (1882–1953), British Labour Party Member of Parliament
Frederick C. Hicks, originally Frederick Hicks Cocks (1872–1925), U.S. Representative from New York

See also
Frederick Cox (disambiguation)